Guo Sheng (Chinese: 郭胜; Pinyin: Guō Shèng; born 7 January 1993) is a Chinese professional football player who currently plays as a midfielder or left-back.

Club career
Guo was promoted to Shaanxi Renhe's first team squad by Milorad Kosanović in 2011. He played mostly in the reserve team league and didn't appear for the first team in the 2011 season. He followed the club to move to Guizhou in 2012. On 4 July 2012, he made his senior debut for Guizhou Renhe in the third round of 2012 Chinese FA Cup which Guizhou beat League One side Guangdong Sunray Cave 2–0. His first Super League debut came on 30 September, when Yang Hao was injured and team manager Gao Hongbo decided to give Guo a chance. Guizhou Renhe lost to Guangzhou R&F 1–0, however, Guo made an impressive performance in the match. He became the regular starter of the team after this match and played for the club in the FA Cup final. He made 9 appearances in the 2012 season as the club achieved fourth place in the Super League and runners-up in the FA Cup and gained the entry into AFC Champions League for the first time.

On 14 July 2013, Guo was loaned to China League One side Shijiazhuang Yongchang Junhao until the end of the season. He made his debut for Shijiazhuang on 20 July 2013 in a 1–0 home victory against Chongqing FC. On 27 July 2013, he scored his first senior goal in a 2–2 home draw against Chengdu Blades. Guo scored three goals in 13 appearances for Shijiazhuang in his loan spell. Guo was loaned to League One side Nei Mongol Zhongyou for one season. He made a permanent transfer to Nei Mongol in February 2016.

Guo transferred back to Shijiazhuang Ever Bright who newly relegated to China League One on 15 February 2017. He would establish himself as a regular with Shijiazhuang as they won promotion back into the Chinese top tier when they came  runners-up at the end of the 2019 league campaign.

Club career statistics
Statistics accurate as of match played 31 December 2021.

References

External links
 

Living people
1993 births
Chinese footballers
Footballers from Shanghai
Beijing Renhe F.C. players
Cangzhou Mighty Lions F.C. players
Inner Mongolia Zhongyou F.C. players
Chinese Super League players
China League One players
Association football midfielders
Association football fullbacks